Timothy M. Keller (born November 22, 1977) is an American businessman and politician serving as the 30th mayor of Albuquerque, New Mexico. A member of the Democratic Party, he served as New Mexico State auditor before resigning to become mayor on December 1, 2017. He is also a former member of the New Mexico State Senate, representing the 17th district.

Early life and education
Keller was born and raised in Albuquerque, New Mexico. His father was a founder of Union Savings Bank and his mother was a public school teacher and homemaker. He was raised as a Roman Catholic and following his graduation from Saint Pius X High School, he attended the University of Notre Dame.[2] Growing up, Keller struggled with dyslexia, though he was not diagnosed until graduate school.

Keller earned a Master of Business Administration from Harvard Business School.

Career

Early career 
Keller is the founder of Digital Divide Data (DDD), which employs and trains disadvantaged persons in Cambodia.[3] DDD is now also present in Laos and Kenya, and has more than 1000 employees. The organization was ranked by Fast Company magazine as a global Top Innovator and by The Global Journal as one of the Top 100 NGOs worldwide.[4]

After graduating from business school, Keller returned to New Mexico where he worked in the community, volunteering for groups that foster economic opportunities in Albuquerque's International District. Keller has served on the boards of the Open Hands Foundation, the Asian American Association, and Albuquerque Southeast Team for Entrepreneur Development. Additionally, Keller spent fifteen years in the private sector, initially in strategic planning for fortune 500 companies and most recently helping Native American governmental financial operations.

New Mexico Senate
Keller was elected in 2008 to represent the people of New Mexico Senate District 17, otherwise known as the International District. In the 49th Legislative Session, Keller introduced 30 pieces of legislation passing 8; 4 of which were signed into law by Governor Bill Richardson.

In the 2011–12 50th Legislative Session, Keller introduced 55 pieces of legislation, passed 14 pieces of legislation, and 5 were signed into law by Governor Susana Martinez including reforming the In-State Business Preference that gives local businesses bidding preference on state government procurement. In December 2012, Keller was elected to the New Mexico State Senate leadership as Majority Whip and served two years until resigning after his election to State Auditor.

New Mexico auditor

2014 election
Keller announced in spring 2013 that he would seek the office of New Mexico State Auditor. During the election, Keller released a TV commercial that received national attention for being one of the most innovative and entertaining political ads of this cycle. On November 4, 2014 Keller was elected State Auditor, defeating Robert Aragon, 54%-46%.

Tenure
Keller served as New Mexico's elected State Auditor from January 2015 through November 2017 when he resigned to assume his role as Mayor of Albuquerque. As Auditor, he primarily focused on helping government work better by providing transparency and accountability for government spending; informing policy choices; and tackling fraud, waste and abuse.[14]

These initiatives included:

 A special audit of New Mexico's backlog of untested Sexual Assault Evidence Kits, commonly known as “rape kits” [15]
 Investigating a lack of oversight, doctored receipts at La Promesa Charter School [17]
 Discovering preferential tax treatment and abuse of power which ultimately led to the resignation and potential prosecution of State Tax and Revenue Secretary
 Money on the Sidelines: Report on Unspent Fund Balances. [29]
 Discovering financial mismanagement at the University of New Mexico Athletics Department, costing the institution hundreds of thousands of dollars.
 A financial audit of the New Mexico Office of the Superintendent of Insurance that rendered 31 findings that ultimately led to a better run agency.

2017 Albuquerque mayoral campaign

In January 2017, Keller announced his intention to run in that year's Albuquerque mayoral election to fight for a safe, inclusive and innovative city. He stated that he would pursue public financing for his campaign by initially raising thousands of five-dollar donations, and pledged to expand the city's Police Department from around 850 officers to 1,200 if elected.
Of the final eight candidates to make the Mayoral ballot, Keller was the only one to receive public financing, collecting nearly 6,000 five-dollar donations from the community, an impressive organizing feat. Keller would receive roughly $380,000 from the city to run his campaign, while his opponents would have no cap to the amount of money they could raise.

Throughout the course of the Election, Keller took part in multitudes of debates and forums, ranging from the standard televised debates for local channels, KRQE and KOB, as well as community based such as MIABQ's Forum for Young People, Young Professionals and Young Families, Dukes Up #RealTalk Forum and the Weekly Alibi's candidate Q&A.

On October 3, Keller topped the ballot with 39 percent of the vote, 16 percentage points ahead of the second-placed candidate, Republican Albuquerque City Councilman Dan Lewis, whom Keller would face in a runoff election in November.

Run-off Election:
Seen as the front-runner, Keller continued to garner broad support from across the city, including endorsements from the Fraternal Order of Police, recognition for his bipartisan work as Auditor and Senator, and his pragmatic vision for the city's future.

In the Albuquerque mayoral runoff election on November 14, 2017, Keller defeated Lewis with 62% of the vote. Keller resigned from his position as State Auditor on November 30, 2017.

2021 Albuquerque mayoral campaign

In November 2021, Keller won reelection to a second term.

Mayor of Albuquerque

Transition

After his election, Keller outlined the trajectory of his administration. With just an 8-day transition, the Keller administration quickly named his executive team, including the first female chief administrative officer, Sarita Nair.

After assuming office, Keller appointed new leadership at the Albuquerque Police Department. On November 28, 2017, Mayor Keller announced he would be naming Michael Geier as interim Chief-of-Police. In addition, Harold Medina, Rogelio "Roger" Banez, and Eric Garcia were named deputy chiefs.

Inauguration
On December 1, 2017, Keller was sworn in as the 30th mayor of Albuquerque.

Sustainability
Mayor Keller issued an executive order for the City of Albuquerque to use 100% renewable energy by 2030. including building a large solar farm on the nearby Jicarilla Reservation.

Personal life
An avid football player, Keller played quarterback for Albuquerque's professional indoor football team, the Duke City Gladiators, for their 2018 season opener. Keller was profiled as the “#MetalMayor” by The New York Times and has introduced a number of bands live on stage in Albuquerque. He is also an advocate for Dyslexia awareness after being diagnosed with the disorder himself and re-learning various reading and processing skills as an adult.

Electoral history

See also
 List of mayors of the 50 largest cities in the United States

References

External links
 NM State Auditor
 Timothy M. Keller at New Mexico Legislature

|-

1977 births
21st-century American politicians
American Roman Catholics
Harvard Business School alumni
Living people
Democratic Party New Mexico state senators
Mayors of Albuquerque, New Mexico
State auditors of New Mexico
University of Notre Dame alumni